Reinier Jan Cornelis Blom (31 March 1867 in Amsterdam – 12 August 1943 in Amsterdam) was a Dutch gymnast who competed in the 1908 Summer Olympics. He was part of the Dutch gymnastics team, which finished seventh in the team event. In the individual all-around competition he finished 61st.

Blom took up gymnastics in 1880 and was active until 1938. During 50 years he was member of KTV Olympia, a gymnastics club in Amsterdam. With this team he won the national championship in 1895. He was founding member of the Royal Dutch Christian Gymnastics Association.

References

External links
 

1867 births
1943 deaths
Dutch male artistic gymnasts
Gymnasts at the 1908 Summer Olympics
Olympic gymnasts of the Netherlands
Gymnasts from Amsterdam